Joseph Liemandt (born 1967/1968) is an American billionaire businessman, and the founder of Trilogy Software, and ESW Capital, an investment company that buys software companies. As of August 2021, his net worth is estimated at US$3 billion.

Liemandt attended Stanford University, but dropped out to start Trilogy Software. In 1996, he was youngest self-made person on the Forbes 400, with a net worth of $500 million.

Liemandt lives in Austin, Texas.

References

American billionaires
American company founders
1960s births
Living people
People from Austin, Texas